Soyuz TMA-7 was a transport mission for portions of the International Space Station (ISS) Expedition 12 crew launched October 1, 2005. The flight delivered ISS Commander William McArthur and ISS Flight Engineer Valery Tokarev to the station to replace Expedition 11 crew members. Spaceflight Participant Gregory Olsen joined the TMA-7 crew for the ascent and docking with the ISS, spent approximately eight days aboard conducting experiments, then returned to Earth with the outgoing members of Expedition 11 aboard Soyuz TMA-6. McArthur and Tokarev were joined on their return trip to Earth by Flight Engineer Marcos Pontes who launched aboard Soyuz TMA-8 and spent approximately seven days aboard the ISS conducting experiments for the Brazilian Space Agency.

Crew

Docking with ISS
Docked to ISS: October 3, 2005, 05:27 UTC (to Pirs module)
Undocked from ISS: November 18, 2005, 08:46 UTC (from Pirs module)
Docked to ISS: November 18, 2005, 09:05 UTC (to nadir port of Zarya)
Undocked from ISS: March 20, 2006, 06:49 UTC (from nadir port of Zarya)
Docked to ISS: March 20, 2006, 07:11 UTC (to aft port of Zvezda)
Undocked from ISS: April 8, 2006, 20:28 UTC (from aft port of Zvezda)

Mission highlights
28th crewed flight to ISS (Flight 11S).

Soyuz TMA-7 is a Soyuz spacecraft which was launched on October 1, 2005 by a Soyuz-FG rocket from Baikonur Cosmodrome.

The spacecraft carried two members of the Expedition 12 crew to the International Space Station, together with the space tourist Gregory Olsen. They replaced the Expedition 11 crew, Commander Sergei Krikalev and John Phillips.

The last member of the original Expedition 12 crew, Thomas Reiter finally launched in July 2006 on STS-121. Owing to shuttle mechanical and weather delays, he was forced to move to Expedition 13.

This was the last flight which is covered by the 1996 "balance" agreement that required the Russians to provide 11 Soyuz spacecraft to ferry joint U.S-Russian crews to and from the International Space Station. Further Soyuz flights needed a renegotiation between NASA and its Russian counterpart, and a modification of the Iran Nonproliferation Act of 2000.

After re-entry, when the pilot parachute was deployed at a height of 10 km the main parachute took a while to open, which caused some concern among the crew and could have been fatal if the main parachute had taken longer to deploy.

Replica
A company in Bauru is building a replica of the capsule that brought Marcos Pontes back to Earth, but they wrongly describe it as the Soyuz TMA-8.

See also

Pictures and narrative of launch.

References

Crewed Soyuz missions
Spacecraft launched in 2005
Orbital space tourism missions
Spacecraft which reentered in 2006
Spacecraft launched by Soyuz-FG rockets